The 1941 Colorado Buffaloes football team was an American football team that represented the University of Colorado as a member of the Mountain States Conference (MSC) during the 1941 college football season. Led by first-year head coach James J. Yeager, the Buffaloes compiled an overall record of 3–4–1 with a mark of 3–2–1 in conference play, tying for fourth place in the MSC. Colorado was outscored by a total of 161 to 97 on the season. The team played its home games at Colorado Stadium in Boulder, Colorado.

Schedule

References

Colorado
Colorado Buffaloes football seasons
Colorado Buffaloes football